Active may refer to:

Music 
 Active (album), a 1992 album by Casiopea
 Active Records, a record label

Ships 
 Active (ship), several commercial ships by that name
 HMS Active, the name of various ships of the British Royal Navy
 USCS Active, a US Coast Survey ship in commission from 1852 to 1861
 USCGC Active, the name of various ships of the US Coast Guard
 USRC Active, the name of various ships of the US Revenue Cutter Service
 USS Active, the name of various ships of the US Navy

Computers and electronics 
 Active Enterprises, a defunct video game developer
 Sky Active, the brand name for interactive features on Sky Digital available in the UK and Ireland
 Active (software), software used for open publishing by Indymedia; see Independent Media Center

Sciences 
 Thermodynamic activity, measure of an effective concentration of a species in a mixture.
 Activation, in chemistry the process whereby something is prepared for a subsequent reaction
 Active (pharmacology), the fraction of a dose of unchanged drug that reaches systemic circulation

Other 
 Active, Alabama, a community in the US
 Active, the original name of the early steam locomotive Locomotion No. 1
 "Actives", current members of fraternities and sororities
 Active living, a lifestyle characterized by frequent or various activities

See also 
 Activity (disambiguation)
 Passive (disambiguation)